Mike Strug is a retired television news reporter and personality from Philadelphia, Pennsylvania.

The Broadcast Pioneers of Philadelphia inducted Strug into their Hall of Fame in 2008.

References 

Living people
American television hosts
Year of birth missing (living people)
Philadelphia television reporters